The Borough of Stafford is a local government district with borough status in Staffordshire, England. It is named after the town of Stafford. It also includes the towns of Stone and Eccleshall, as well as numerous villages such as Weston, Hixon, Barlaston, Baswich, Salt, Ingestre, Sandon and Gnosall.

History

The borough was formed on 1 April 1974, under the Local Government Act 1972, as a merger of the municipal borough of Stafford, Stone urban district, Stafford Rural District and Stone Rural District. A new Civic Centre was constructed at Riverside in Stafford and completed in 1978.

Most its parishes fell within the Hundred of Pirehill.

Wards

It has 26 wards:
Barlaston and Oulton, Baswich, Chartley, Church Eaton, Common, Coton, Eccleshall, Forebridge, Fulford, Gnosall and Woodseaves, Haywood and Hixon, Highfield and Western Downs, Holmcroft, Littleworth, Manor, Milford, Milwich, Penkside, Rowley, Seighford, St. Michael's, Stonefield and Christchurch, Swynnerton, Tillington, Walton and Weeping Cross.

Settlements and parishes of Stafford

References

 
Non-metropolitan districts of Staffordshire
Boroughs in England